Lists of animated television series first aired in the 1980s organized by year:

List of animated television series of 1980
List of animated television series of 1981
List of animated television series of 1982
List of animated television series of 1983
List of animated television series of 1984
List of animated television series of 1985
List of animated television series of 1986
List of animated television series of 1987
List of animated television series of 1988
List of animated television series of 1989

1980s
 
Animated series of 1980s